House of Horn is the debut album by saxophonist Paul Horn which was released on the Dot label in 1957.

Reception

The Allmusic site rated the album 3 stars.

Track listing
All compositions by Paul Horn except as indicated
 "Pony Tale" - 2:55
 "Day by Day" (Axel Stordahl, Paul Weston, Sammy Cahn) - 4:36
 "A Soldier's Dream" (Allyn Ferguson) - 3:39
 "House of Horn" - 3:30
 "The Golden Princess" (Fred Katz) -  3:31
 "Sunday, Monday, or Always" (Jimmy Van Heusen Johnny Burke) - 3:53
 "To a Little Boy" - 4:07
 "Siddartha" (Katz) - 5:47
 "Interlude" (Pete Rugolo) - 4:26
recorded at Radio Recorders in Hollywood, CA on September 27, 1957 (tracks 2, 3, 7 & 8) and September 30, 1957 (tracks 1, 4-6 & 9)

Personnel
Paul Horn - alto saxophone, flute, piccolo, clarinet
Fred Katz - cello, piano
Larry Bunker - vibraphone
Gerald Wiggins - piano, celeste
John Pisano - guitar
Red Mitchell - bass
Chico Hamilton as "Forest Thorn" - drums
David Frisina, Dan Lube - violin (tracks 2, 3, 7 & 8)
David Sterkin - viola (2, 3, 7 & 8)
Bill Marx - bells (track 5)
Allyn Ferguson, Pete Rugolo - arranger

References

Dot Records albums
Paul Horn (musician) albums
Albums arranged by Allyn Ferguson
1957 debut albums